Events from the year 1162 in Ireland.

Incumbents
High King: Muirchertach Mac Lochlainn

Events
Lorcán Ua Tuathail (St Laurence O'Toole) elected as Archbishop of Dublin.

Births

Deaths

References